Duatentopet or Tentopet was an ancient Egyptian queen of the 20th Dynasty, the wife of Pharaoh Ramesses IV, and mother of Ramesses V. Even though the identity of Ramesses IV's wife has not been clearly stated in history, she is considered the most likely candidate by virtue of the titles she was given and which were found listed in her tomb (QV74).

In the Karnak Temple Complex, an Adoratrix named Tentopet is shown with Ramesses III in the Temple of Khonsu.  It is thought likely that Tentopet and Queen Duatentopet were the same person, and that she was a daughter of Ramesses III.  This would make her a sister, or a half-sister, of her husband.

Her steward Amenhotep was buried in Theban tomb TT346.

References

Bibliography 
 

12th-century BC Egyptian women
12th-century BC clergy
Queens consort of the Twentieth Dynasty of Egypt
Ramesses III
Ramesses IV